Kulish is a surname of Ukrainian origin. In the Ukrainian language kulish means  "millet porridge". Its Russian variation is kulesh which should be differentiated from kulesha (maize flour porridge).

List of people

English transliteration
 Karpoor Chand Kulish (1926–2006), the founder of Rajasthan Patrika, a Hindi language newspaper of Rajasthan, India.
 Kiril Kulish, an American actor, singer, and dancer, who is best known as being one of the original Billy's in the Broadway production of Billy Elliot the Musical
 Nicholas Kulish (born 1975, Washington, D.C.), journalist who reports for The New York Times as Berlin bureau chief as of August 2007 and wrote the book Last One In
 Panteleimon Kulish (1819–1897), Ukrainian writer
 Mykola Kulish (1892–1937), Ukrainian writer and a film director

Polish spelling (Kulisz) 
 Adam Kulisz, pseudonym: Coolish (born 1966), Polish vocalist, guitarist, harmonica player, composer, author
 Karol Kulisz (1873, Dzięgielów - 1940, KZ Buchenwald), Polish Lutheran pastor

German spelling (Kulisch) 
 Angelika Kulisch (born 1989, Milicz), Polish female bicycle racer
 Gustav Adolf Kulisch (1903, Breslau - ?), German politician (NSDAP)
 Paul Kulisch (1862, Hrastnigg - 1943, Freising), Austrian-German agronomist
 Ulrich W. Kulisch (born 1933, Breslau), German mathematician specializing in numerical analysis

See also 
 Related & similar surnames
 Kulesh
 Kulesha (Кулеша)
 Kuleshin (Кулешин)
 Kuleshov (Кулешов)
 Kulishov (Кулишов)
 Kulisher (Kulischer)
 Kalisz (disambiguation)
 Kalisch (Kallisch), Kalischer
 Kolisch, Kollisch

References 

Slavic-language surnames
Ukrainian-language surnames